Seth M.R. Jaipuria Schools is a group of schools run by the Seth M.R. Jaipuria Group. The schools draw their name from 1971 Padma Bhushan awardee Mungtu Ram Jaipuria, a philanthropist and industrialist who played a dominant role in the industrialization of the nation after independence.

History 
The group started its first school in Lucknow in 1992, Seth M.R.Jaipuria School, Lucknow.

As of 2021, the group of schools has 34 K12 schools, 28,000+ students and has 2000+ educationists. It has a target of achieving 100,000 students and 5000 educators across 75 sustainable schools pan-India by 2025.

List of schools

Year 1992
Seth M.R. Jaipuria School, Lucknow, Uttar Pradesh

Year 2014
Seth M.R. Jaipuria School, Sitapur Road (Bansal Campus), Lucknow, Uttar Pradesh

Year 2015
Seth M.R.Scoolfaizabad.in/ Seth M.R. Jaipuria School, Ayodhya, Uttar Pradesh
Seth M.R. Jaipuria School, Patna, Bihar
Seth M.R. Jaipuria School, Barabanki, Uttar Pradesh

Year 2016
Seth M.R. Jaipuria School, Sultanpur, Uttar Pradesh
Seth M.R. Jaipuria School, Hardoi, Uttar Pradesh
Seth M.R. Jaipuria School, Goel Campus, Ayodhya Road, Lucknow, Uttar Pradesh

Year 2017
Seth M.R. Jaipuria School, Banaras, (Babatpur Campus), Uttar Pradesh
Seth M.R. Jaipuria School, Fatehpur, Uttar Pradesh
Seth M.R. Jaipuria School, Bahraich, Uttar Pradesh
Seth M.R. Jaipuria School, Kanpur Road, Lucknow, Uttar Pradesh

Year 2018
Seth M.R. Jaipuria School, Ballia, Uttar Pradesh
Seth M.R. Jaipuria School, Rajajipuram, Lucknow, Uttar Pradesh
Seth M.R. Jaipuria School, Shahjahanpur, Uttar Pradesh
Seth M.R. Jaipuria School, Gonda, Uttar Pradesh
Seth M.R. Jaipuria School, Lakhimpur, Uttar Pradesh
Seth M.R. Jaipuria School, Sonbhadra, Uttar Pradesh
Seth M.R. Jaipuria School, Orai, Uttar Pradesh

Year 2019 

 Seth M.R. Jaipuria School, Gorakhpur (Gida Campus), Uttar Pradesh
 Seth M.R. Jaipuria School, Lucknow (Kursi Road), Uttar Pradesh
 Seth M.R. Jaipuria School, Kanpur (Naramau Campus), Uttar Pradesh
 Seth M.R. Jaipuria School, Fatehpur (Malwa Campus), Uttar Pradesh
 Seth M.R. Jaipuria School, Azamgarh, Uttar Pradesh
 Seth M.R. Jaipuria School, Padrauna, Uttar Pradesh

Year 2020 

 Seth M.R. Jaipuria School, Jagdishpur, Uttar Pradesh
 Seth M.R. Jaipuria School, Pratapgarh, Uttar Pradesh
 Seth M.R. Jaipuria School, Rasra, Uttar Pradesh
 Seth M.R. Jaipuria School, Kanpur (Azad Nagar), Uttar Pradesh
 Seth M.R. Jaipuria School, Barwani, Madhya Pradesh

Year 2021 

 Seth M.R. Jaipuria School, Bareilly, Uttar Pradesh
 Seth M.R. Jaipuria School, Muzaffarabad, Uttar Pradesh
 Seth M.R. Jaipuria School, Mahmudabad, Uttar Pradesh
 Seth M.R. Jaipuria School, Prayagraj (Vatsalya Campus), Uttar Pradesh
 Seth M.R. Jaipuria School, Basti, Uttar Pradesh
 Seth M.R. Jaipuria School, Deoria, Uttar Pradesh
 Seth M.R. Jaipuria School, Greater Noida West, Uttar Pradesh
 Seth M.R. Jaipuria School, Lucknow (Shaheed Path), Uttar Pradesh
 Seth M.R. Jaipuria School, Raebareli, Uttar Pradesh
 Seth M.R. Jaipuria School, Rooma Kanpur, Uttar Pradesh
 Seth M.R. Jaipuria School, Shikohabad, Uttar Pradesh

References

External links
https://timesofindia.indiatimes.com/city/lucknow/Parents-oppose-30-fee-hike-in-Jaipuria-School/articleshow/51786658.cms
http://www.thehindu.com/todays-paper/tp-national/lucknows-jaipuria-school-wins-young-world-quiz/article18187918.ece

https://timesofindia.indiatimes.com/city/lucknow/Lucknow-schools-widen-safety-net-issue-ID-cards-to-parents-for-picking-kids/articleshow/18840392.cms

Private schools in Delhi
Educational institutions established in 1992
Central Board of Secondary Education
1992 establishments in Delhi